Visa Mäkinen (born 28 March 1945 in Pori, Finland) is a Finnish film director, film producer, actor and screen writer.

He has directed and produced films such as the 1983 James Bond spoof Agent 000 and the Deadly Curves which featured  actors Ilmari Saarelainen and Tenho Sauren.

He has also acted and written for several films.

Filmography

Feature films
 Voi juku, mikä lauantai (1979)
 Mitäs me sankarit (1980)
 Kaikenlaisia karkureita (1981)
 Pi, pi, pil... pilleri (1982)
 Likainen puolitusina (1982)
 Agentti 000 ja kuoleman kurvit (1983)
 Vapaa duunari Ville-Kalle (1984)
 Yön saalistajat (1984)
 Pekka & Pätkä ja tuplajättipotti (1985)
 Pekka Puupää poliisina (1987)
 Ruuvit löysällä (1988)
 Pirtua, pirtua (1991)

Short films
 Seksiä nupissa (-)
 Päivä ratsastustalleilla (1989)
 Matkiva kulkuri (1989)
 Sexis spaketti ja Brunon parhaat (1989)

TV series
 Pekka Puupää tositoimissa (1982)
 Pekka Puupää seikkailee (1982)
 Pekko aikamiespoika (1992)
 Cafe Kirpputori (1996)
 Camping Satumaa (1998)

Video programmes
 Video Bingo (1992)
 Kauneimmat joululaulut (1992)

External links

1945 births
Living people
People from Pori
Finnish film directors
Finnish film producers
Finnish male actors
Finnish screenwriters